The Virgin Islands coqui (Eleutherodactylus schwartzi) is a species of frog in the family Eleutherodactylidae. The species is endemic to the British Virgin Islands and the US Virgin Islands.

Etymology
The specific name, schwartzi, is in honor of American herpetologist Albert Schwartz.

Habitat
The natural habitats of E. schwartzi are subtropical or tropical dry forests.

Conservation status
E. schwartzi is threatened by habitat loss.

References

Further reading
Schwartz A, Thomas R. 1975. A Check-list of West Indian Amphibians and Reptiles. Carnegie Museum of Natural History Special Publication No. 1. Pittsburgh, Pennsylvania: Carnegie Museum of Natural History. 216 pp. (Eleutherodactylus schwartzi, p. 36).
Thomas R. 1966. "New species of Antillean Eleutherodactylus ". Quart. J. Florida Acad. Sci. 28 (4): 375–391. (Eleutherodactylus schwartzi, new species, pp. 386–390).

Eleutherodactylus
Amphibians of the United States Virgin Islands
Amphibians described in 1966
Taxonomy articles created by Polbot
Taxa named by Richard Thomas (herpetologist)